Yarışlı may refer to places in Turkey such as:

 Yarışlı, Şuhut
 Yarışlı, Yeşilova
 Lake Yarışlı